Madras School of Social Work (MSSW) is an autonomous college located in Chennai, Tamil Nadu, India. Established in 1952. It is affiliated to the University of Madras and offers various under-graduate and graduate courses in social sciences.

History
Madras School of Social Work, established in 1952, located in Chennai, South India, is an Autonomous Institution, NAAC accredited and affiliated to University of Madras. Madras School of Social Work was founded by Mary Clubwala Jadhav under the auspices of Madras State Branch of the Indian Conference of Social Work (renamed the Indian Council of Social Welfare) and the Guild of Service (central). The school is run under the aegis of the Society for Social Education and Research (SSER). Madras School of Social Work is a member of the Association of Schools of Social Work in India and the Asia – Pacific Association of Social Work Education. The School is also affiliated to the International Association of Schools of Social Work. The School is rated 3rd Best Social Work College in India and First in South India.

Founder 
Born in 1908 into a rich Parsi family, Mary Clubwala Jadhav was raised strictly in the traditional way by her mother who taught her the values of caring and sharing. In 1926, she was married to Mr. Nogi Clubwala who encouraged her to involve in social activities. In 1937, Mrs. Mary Clubwala was made as the honorary secretary of the Guild of Service. In 1942, with World War II raging Mrs. Clubwala founded the Indian Hospitality Committee and persuaded women from all communities and walks of life to join in the effort to organise mobile canteens, hospital visits, diversional therapy and entertainment programmes for the army men.The victorious 14th Army presented her a Japanese sword in appreciation of her tremendous efforts. Mrs. Mary Clubwala was called “the Darling of the Army” by General Cariappa! After the War, her focus was once again on the Guild of Service which put down roots for various projects like health centres, bakery units, an adoption centre, family assistance schemes, Meals on Wheels, rural development projects, a school for the deaf, to name just a few.

Mrs. Clubwala’s concern for destitute children was responsible for starting the Seva Samajam Boys’ Home and the Seva Samajam Girls’ Home in Adyar in 1950. In 1954, she helped get started, through the joint efforts of the Guild and the Madras Rotary Club, the Bala Vihar in Kilpauk, a school for mentally challenged children. Perhaps Mrs. Clubwala’s most significant contribution was establishing the Madras School of Social Work in 1952 as the fourth social work institution in India and the first institution in South India. She had been honoured by the International Council of Social Welfare with the “Outstanding Service Award” at Hague in 1972. She has also been awarded the “Padma Shri” by Government of India. On 6 February 1975, she died in Bombay after a surgery to fight cancer. Condoling her death, Mrs. Indira Gandhi mentioned that India lost an eminent social worker.

Academic programmes 

Master of Social Work - MSW (aided & self financed)

MSc Counseling Psychology (self financed)

M.A. Human Resource Management (self financed)

M.A. Human Resources & Organizational Development (self financed)

M.A. Development Management (self financed)

M.A. Social Entrepreneurship (self financed)

Bachelor of Social Work (self financed)

BSc Psychology (self financed)

PG Diploma in Human Resources Management (in partnership with Kelsa)

PG Diploma (Hons) in Personnel Management and Industrial Relations

Research programmes 
M.Phil. Social Work & Psychology / Ph.D. in Social Work

The College offers full-time M.Phil programme in Social Work and Psychology. For admission to the programme, candidates should have passed two year PG Degree course in the relevant discipline (with 55% marks after 1991 and 50% before 1991) after three year bachelor's degree course and higher secondary of 12 years duration. Candidates who have passed PG degree examination with less than 17 years of course duration are not eligible for admission.

The College offers both Full-time and Part-time (teacher & non-teacher) Ph.D programs. The candidate should have obtained a master's degree with not less than second class or equivalent grade or 50% marks in the qualifying examination. The admission procedure will be according to University of Madras guidelines which can be obtained from the University office.

Infrastructural facilities 

Library

The College has a well-stocked library with around 16,000 books and several journals and periodicals. The Library is fully computerized and renders bar-coded services. Implementing the Selective Dissemination of Information system, the library offers excellent support for students to prepare their assignments and project reports. The Library also offers photocopying facility.
 
Computer centre

The college has a full-fledged computer center with multimedia computers, internet, and printer facilities. Subject to the rules for each course, students can make use of the centre for e-mail, internet browsing, word processing, creating presentations and data analysis. Students are also given basic orientation in use of Computers and Internet.
 
Audio-visual

Most classrooms are equipped with LCD projectors.
 
Vehicle parking

Two-wheelers of students are permitted to be parked inside the Campus at earmarked locations against fees payable. Four-wheelers of students or visitors are not permitted inside the Campus for any reason whatsoever due to inadequate parking facilities.
 
Hostel

There is limited hostel facilities within the campus. Students from outside Tamil Nadu will be given preference in hostel admission. A student seeking hostel accommodation has to provide a joint undertaking along with the parent/guardian concerned,  to respect the terms and conditions governing his/her conduct in the premises of the hostel as an inmate.

Visit www.mssw.in for complete details
 

Schools of social work
Universities and colleges in Chennai
Colleges affiliated to University of Madras